This is a bibliography of notable works about the Ottoman Empire.

Encyclopedias

Surveys
 Baram, Uzi and Lynda Carroll, editors. A Historical Archaeology of the Ottoman Empire: Breaking New Ground (Plenum/Kluwer Academic Press, 2000)
 Barkey, Karen. Empire of Difference: The Ottomans in Comparative Perspective. (2008) 357pp Amazon.com, excerpt and text search
 Davison, Roderic H. Reform in the Ottoman Empire, 1856–1876 (New York: Gordian Press, 1973)
 Deringil, Selim. The Well-Protected Domains: Ideology and the Legitimation of Power in the Ottoman Empire, 1876–1909 (London: IB Tauris, 1998)
 Faroqhi, Suraiya. The Ottoman Empire: A Short History (2009) 196pp
 Faroqhi, Suraiya. The Cambridge History of Turkey (Volume 3, 2006)  excerpt and text search
 Faroqhi, Suraiya and Kate Fleet, eds. The Cambridge History of Turkey (Volume 2 2012) essays by scholars
 
 Fleet, Kate, ed.  The Cambridge History of Turkey (Volume 1, 2009) excerpt and text search, essays by scholars
 
 Inalcik, Halil. The Ottoman Empire, the Classical Age: 1300–1600. Hachette UK, 2013. [1973]
 Kasaba, Resat, ed. The Cambridge History of Turkey (vol 4 2008) excerpt and text search vol 4 comprehensive coverage by scholars of 20th century
 Dimitri Kitsikis, L'Empire ottoman, Presses Universitaires de France, 3rd ed.,1994. , in French
 McCarthy, Justin. The Ottoman Turks: An Introductory History to 1923 1997 
 McMeekin, Sean. The Berlin-Baghdad Express: The Ottoman Empire and Germany's Bid for World Power (2010)
 Pamuk, Sevket. A Monetary History of the Ottoman Empire (1999). pp. 276
 Quataert, Donald. The Ottoman Empire, 1700–1922 (2005) .
 Shaw, Stanford J., and Ezel Kural Shaw. History of the Ottoman Empire and Modern Turkey. Vol. 1, 1977.
 Somel, Selcuk Aksin. Historical Dictionary of the Ottoman Empire. (2003). 399 pp.

The Early Ottomans (1300–1453)
 
 
 
 
 İnalcık Halil, et al. The Ottoman Empire: the Classical Age, 1300–1600. Phoenix, 2013.

The Era of Transformation (1550–1700)

to 1830
 Braude, Benjamin, and Bernard Lewis, eds. Christians and Jews in the Ottoman Empire: The Functioning of a Plural Society  (1982)  
 Goffman, Daniel. The Ottoman Empire and Early Modern Europe (2002)
 Guilmartin, John F., Jr. "Ideology and Conflict: The Wars of the Ottoman Empire, 1453–1606", Journal of Interdisciplinary History, (Spring 1988) 18:4., pp721–747.
 Kunt, Metin and Woodhead, Christine, ed. Süleyman the Magnificent and His Age: The Ottoman Empire in the Early Modern World. 1995. 218 pp.
 Parry, V.J. A History of the Ottoman Empire to 1730 (1976)
 Şahin, Kaya. Empire and Power in the Reign of Süleyman: Narrating the Sixteenth-Century Ottoman World. Cambridge University Press, 2013.
 Shaw, Stanford J. History of the Ottoman Empire and Modern Turkey, Vol I; Empire of Gazis: The Rise and Decline of the Ottoman Empire 1290–1808. Cambridge University Press, 1976. .

Post 1830
 Ahmad, Feroz. The Young Turks: The Committee of Union and Progress in Turkish Politics, 1908–1914, (1969).
 Bein, Amit. Ottoman Ulema, Turkish Republic: Agents of Change and Guardians of Tradition (2011) Amazon.com
 Black, Cyril E., and L. Carl Brown. Modernization in the Middle East: The Ottoman Empire and Its Afro-Asian Successors. 1992.
 Erickson, Edward J. Ordered to Die: A History of the Ottoman Army in the First World War (2000) Amazon.com, excerpt and text search
 Gürkan, Emrah Safa: Christian Allies of the Ottoman Empire, European History Online, Mainz: Institute of European History, 2011. Retrieved 2 November 2011.
 Faroqhi, Suraiya. Subjects of the Sultan: Culture and Daily Life in the Ottoman Empire. (2000) 358 pp.
 Findley, Carter V. Bureaucratic Reform in the Ottoman Empire: The Sublime Porte, 1789–1922 (Princeton University Press, 1980)
 Fortna, Benjamin C. Imperial Classroom: Islam, the State, and Education in the Late Ottoman Empire. (2002) 280 pp.
 Fromkin, David. A Peace to End All Peace: The Fall of the Ottoman Empire and the Creation of the Modern Middle East (2001)
 Gingeras, Ryan. The Last Days of the Ottoman Empire. London: Allen Lane, 2023.
 Göçek, Fatma Müge. Rise of the Bourgeoisie, Demise of Empire: Ottoman Westernization and Social Change. (1996). 220 pp.
 Hanioglu, M. Sukru. A Brief History of the Late Ottoman Empire (2008) Amazon.com, excerpt and text search
 Inalcik, Halil and Quataert, Donald, ed. An Economic and Social History of the Ottoman Empire, 1300–1914. 1995. 1026 pp.
 Karpat, Kemal H. The Politicization of Islam: Reconstructing Identity, State, Faith, and Community in the Late Ottoman State. (2001). 533 pp.
 Kayali, Hasan. Arabs and Young Turks: Ottomanism, Arabism, and Islamism in the Ottoman Empire, 1908–1918 (1997); CDlib.org, complete text online
 Kieser, Hans-Lukas, Margaret Lavinia Anderson, Seyhan Bayraktar, and Thomas Schmutz, eds. The End of the Ottomans: The Genocide of 1915 and the Politics of Turkish Nationalism. London: I.B. Tauris, 2019.
 Kushner, David. The Rise of Turkish Nationalism, 1876–1908. 1977.
 McCarthy, Justin. The Ottoman Peoples and the End of Empire. Hodder Arnold, 2001. .
 McMeekin, Sean. The Ottoman Endgame: War, Revolution and the Making of the Modern Middle East, 1908-1923. London: Allen Lane, 2015.
 Miller, William. The Ottoman Empire, 1801–1913. (1913), Books.Google.com full text online
 Quataert, Donald. Social Disintegration and Popular Resistance in the Ottoman Empire, 1881–1908. 1983.
 Rodogno, Davide. Against Massacre: Humanitarian Interventions in the Ottoman Empire, 1815–1914 (2011)
 Shaw, Stanford J., and Ezel Kural Shaw. History of the Ottoman Empire and Modern Turkey. Vol. 2, Reform, Revolution, and Republic: The Rise of Modern Turkey, 1808–1975. (1977). Amazon.com, excerpt and text search
 Toledano, Ehud R. The Ottoman Slave Trade and Its Suppression, 1840–1890. (1982)

Military

Historiography
 Emrence, Cern. "Three Waves of Late Ottoman Historiography, 1950–2007," Middle East Studies Association Bulletin (2007) 41#2 pp 137–151.
 Finkel, Caroline. "Ottoman History: Whose History Is It?," International Journal of Turkish Studies (2008) 14#1 pp 1–10. How historians in different countries view the Ottoman Empire
 Hajdarpasic, Edin. "Out of the Ruins of the Ottoman Empire: Reflections on the Ottoman Legacy in South-eastern Europe," Middle Eastern Studies (2008) 44#5 pp 715–734.
 
 Kırlı, Cengiz. "From Economic History to Cultural History in Ottoman Studies," International Journal of Middle East Studies (May 2014) 46#2 pp 376–378  DOI: 10.1017/S0020743814000166
 Mikhail, Alan; Philliou, Christine M. "The Ottoman Empire and the Imperial Turn," Comparative Studies in Society & History (2012) 54#4 pp 721–745. Comparing the Ottomans to other empires opens new insights about the dynamics of imperial rule, periodization, and political transformation
 Pierce, Leslie. "Changing Perceptions of the Ottoman Empire: The Early Centuries," Mediterranean Historical Review (2004) 49#1 pp 6–28. How historians treat 1299 to 1700

Journal articles
  at Persée

See also

 History of the Ottoman Empire

External links
 Empire ottoman -- 1839-1876 (Tanzimat) - National Library of France (BnF)
 L'Empire ottoman, 1839-1877. L'Angleterre et la Russie dans la question d'Orient par un Ancien Diplomatie
 Législation ottomane depuis le rétablissement de la constitution, 24 Djemazi-ul-Ahir 1326-10 Juillet 1324/1908
 
Books about the Ottoman Empire
Ottoman Empire
Ottoman Empire